The island of Taiwan, also commonly known as Formosa, was partly under colonial rule by the Dutch Republic from 1624 to 1662 and from 1664 to 1668. In the context of the Age of Discovery, the Dutch East India Company established its presence on Formosa to trade with the Ming Empire in neighbouring China and Tokugawa shogunate in Japan, and also to interdict Portuguese and Spanish trade and colonial activities in East Asia.

The Dutch were not universally welcomed, and uprisings by both aborigines and recent Han arrivals were quelled by the Dutch military on more than one occasion. With the rise of the Qing dynasty in the early 17th century, the Dutch East India Company cut ties with the Ming dynasty and allied with the Qing instead, in exchange for the right to unfettered access to their trade and shipping routes. The colonial period was brought to an end after the 1662 siege of Fort Zeelandia by Koxinga's army who promptly dismantled the Dutch colony, expelled the Dutch and established the Ming loyalist, anti-Qing Kingdom of Tungning.

History

Background

As late comers in sailing the seas of the world, the Netherlands and England came, at the beginning of the 17th century, inevitably in conflict with the forces of Spain and Portugal. In ideological terms, the conflict was expressed in the Iberian powers being Catholic, while during the commercial development of England and the Netherlands, both had separated their religious institutions from Papal Rome.

The Dutch first attempted to trade with China in 1601 but were rebuffed by the Chinese authorities, who were already engaged in trade with the Portuguese at Macau from 1535.

Once there, the admiral attempted to negotiate trade terms with the Chinese on the mainland, but was asked to pay an exorbitant fee for the privilege of an interview. Surrounded by a vastly superior Chinese fleet, he left without achieving any of his aims.

The Dutch East India Company tried to use military force to make China open up a port in Fujian to trade and demanded that China expel the Portuguese, whom the Dutch were fighting in the Dutch–Portuguese War, from Macau. The Dutch raided Chinese shipping after 1618 and took junks hostage in an unsuccessful attempt to get China to meet their demands.

In 1622, after another unsuccessful Dutch attack on Macau (trade post of Portugal from 1557) and the failure to set up a trading post in Fat Tong O (present day Hong Kong), the fleet sailed to the Pescadores, this time intentionally, and proceeded to set up a base there at Makung. They built a fort with forced labour recruited from the local Chinese population. Their oversight was reportedly so severe and rations so short that 1,300 of the 1,500 Chinese enslaved died in the process of construction. The same year a ship named the Golden Lion (Dutch: Gouden Leeuw) was wrecked at Lamey just off the southwest coast of Formosa; the survivors were slaughtered by the native inhabitants. The following year, 1623, Dutch traders in search of an Asian base first arrived on the island, intending to use the island as a station for Dutch commerce with Japan and the coastal areas of China.

The Dutch demanded that China open up ports in Fujian to Dutch trade. China refused, warning the Dutch that the Pescadores were Chinese territory. The Chinese governor of Fujian (Fukien), Shang Zhouzuo (Shang Chou-tso), demanded that the Dutch withdraw from the Pescadores to Formosa, where the Chinese would permit them to engage in trade. This led to a war between the Dutch and China between 1622 and 1624 which ended with the Chinese being successful in making the Dutch abandon the Pescadores and withdraw to Formosa. The Dutch threatened that China would face Dutch raids on Chinese ports and shipping unless the Chinese allowed trading on the Pescadores and that China not trade with Manila but only with the Dutch in Batavia and Siam and Cambodia. However, the Dutch found out that, unlike tiny Southeast Asian kingdoms, China could not be bullied or intimidated by them. After Shang ordered them to withdraw to Formosa on 19 September 1622, the Dutch raided Amoy on October and November. The Dutch intended to "induce the Chinese to trade by force or from fear." by raiding Fujian and Chinese shipping from the Pescadores. Long artillery batteries were erected at Amoy in March 1622 by Colonel Li-kung-hwa as a defence against the Dutch.

On the Dutch attempt in 1623 to force China to open up a port, five Dutch ships were sent to Liu-ao and the mission ended in failure for the Dutch, with a number of Dutch sailors taken prisoner and one of their ships lost. In response to the Dutch using captured Chinese for forced labor and strengthening their garrison in the Pescadores with five more ships in addition to the six already there, the new governor of Fujian, Nan Juyi (Nan Chü-i), was permitted by China to begin preparations to attack the Dutch forces in July 1623. A Dutch raid was defeated by the Chinese at Amoy in October 1623, with the Chinese taking the Dutch commander Christian Francs prisoner and burning one of the four Dutch ships. Yu Zigao began an offensive in February 1624 with warships and troops against the Dutch in the Pescadores with the intent of expelling them. The Chinese offensive reached the Dutch fort on 30 July 1624, with 5,000 Chinese troops (or 10,000) and 40-50 warships under Yu and General Wang Mengxiong surrounding the fort commanded by Marten Sonck, and the Dutch were forced to sue for peace on 3 August and folded before the Chinese demands, withdrawing from the Pescadores to Formosa. The Dutch admitted that their attempt at military force to coerce China into trading with them had failed with their defeat in the Pescadores. At the Chinese victory celebrations over the "red-haired barbarians," as the Dutch were called by the Chinese, Nan Juyi (Nan Chü-yi) paraded twelve Dutch soldiers who were captured before the Emperor in Beijing. The Dutch were astonished that their violence did not intimidate the Chinese and at the subsequent Chinese attack on their fort in the Pescadores, since they thought them as timid and a "faint-hearted troupe," based on their experience with them in Southeast Asia.

Early years (1624–1625)
When the Dutch arrived in Taiwan, they found the southwest already frequented by a mostly-transient Chinese population numbering close to 1,500.

On deciding to set up in Taiwan and in common with standard practice at the time, the Dutch built a defensive fort to act as a base of operations. This was built on the sandy peninsula of Taoyuan (now part of mainland Taiwan, in current-day Anping District). This temporary fort was replaced four years later by the more substantial Fort Zeelandia.

Growing control, pacification of the aborigines (1626–1636)

The first order of business was to punish villages that had violently opposed the Dutch and unite the aborigines in allegiance with the Dutch East India Company (VOC). The first punitive expedition was against the villages of Bakloan and Mattau, north of Saccam near Tayowan. The Mattau campaign was easier than expected, and the tribe submitted after having their village razed by fire. The campaign also served as a threat to other villages from Tirosen (Chiayi) to Longkiau (Hengchun).

While the pacification campaign continued in Formosa, at sea, relations with the Chinese were strained by the Dutch attempts to tax ships in the Taiwan Strait. War eventually broke out between the Ming and the Dutch, and the Chinese Admiral Zheng Zhilong defeated the Dutch at the Battle of Liaoluo Bay in 1633.

Some Dutch missionaries were killed by aboriginals whom they had tried to convert: "The catechist, Daniel Hendrickx, whose name has been often mentioned, accompanied this expedition to the south, as his great knowledge of the Formosa language and his familiar intercourse with the natives, rendered his services very valuable. On reaching the island of Pangsuy, he ventured—perhaps with overweening confidence in himself— too far away from the others, and was suddenly surrounded by a great number of armed natives, who, after killing him, carried away in triumph his head, arms, legs, and other members, even his entrails, leaving the mutilated trunk behind."

Pax Hollandica and the ousting of the Spanish (1636–1642)

Following the pacification campaigns of 1635–1636, more and more villages came to the Dutch to swear allegiance, sometimes out of fear of Dutch military action, and sometimes for the benefits which Dutch protection could bring (food and security). These villages stretched from Longkiau in the south (125 km from the Dutch base at Fort Zeelandia) to Favorlang in central Taiwan, 90 km to the north of Fort Zeelandia. The relative calm of this period has been called the Pax Hollandica (Dutch Peace) by some commentators (a reference to the Pax Romana).

One area not under their control was the north of the island, which from 1626 had been under Spanish sway, with their two settlements at Tamsui and Keelung. The fortification at Keelung was abandoned because the Spanish lacked the resources to maintain it, but Fort Santo Domingo in Tamsui was seen as a major obstacle to Dutch ambitions on the island and the region in general.

After failing to drive out the Spanish in 1641, the Dutch returned in 1642 with reinforcements of Dutch soldiers and aboriginal warriors in ships, managing to dislodge the small Spanish-Filipino contingent from their fortress and drive them from the island. Following this victory, the Dutch set about bringing the northern villages under their banner in a similar way to the pacification campaign carried out in the previous decade in the south.

Growing Han presence and the Guo Huaiyi Rebellion (1643–1659)

The Dutch began to encourage large-scale Han immigration to the island, mainly from the south of Hokkien. Most of the immigrants were young single males who were discouraged from staying on the island, often referred to by Han as "The Gate of Hell" for its reputation in taking the lives of sailors and explorers. After one uprising by Hanin 1640, the Guo Huaiyi Rebellion in 1652 saw an organised insurrection against the Dutch, fuelled by anger over punitive taxes and corrupt officials. The Dutch again put down the revolt hard, with fully 25% of those participating in the rebellion being killed over a period of a couple of weeks.

Aboriginal rebellions in other areas of Taiwan (1650s)

Multiple Aboriginal villages rebelled against the Dutch in the 1650s due to oppression like when the Dutch ordered aboriginal women for sex, deer pelts, and rice be given to them from aborigines in the Taipei basin in Wu-lao-wan village which sparked a rebellion in December 1652 at the same time as the Chinese rebellion. Two Dutch translators were beheaded by the Wu-lao-wan aborigines and in a subsequent fight 30 aboriginals and another two Dutch people died. After an embargo of salt and iron on Wu-lao-wan the aboriginals were forced to sue for peace in February 1653.

Siege of Zeelandia and the end of Dutch government on Formosa (1660–1662)

Following a nine-month siege, Koxinga captured Zeelandia. Koxinga then forced the local representatives of the Dutch East India Company to sign a peace treaty at Zeelandia on 1 February 1662, and leave the island. From then on, the island became Koxinga's base for the Kingdom of Tungning.

Retaking of Keelung (1664–1668) and further hostilities
After being ousted from Taiwan, the Dutch allied with the new Qing dynasty in China against the Zheng regime in Taiwan. Following some skirmishes the Dutch retook the northern fortress at Keelung in 1664. Zheng Jing sent troops to dislodge the Dutch, but they were unsuccessful. The Dutch held out at Keelung until 1668, when aborigine resistance (likely incited by Zheng Jing), and the lack of progress in retaking any other parts of the island persuaded the colonial authorities to abandon this final stronghold and withdraw from Taiwan altogether.

Keelung was a lucrative possession for the Dutch East India Company with 26% of the company's profits coming from their Taiwan operations in 1664.

Zheng Jing's navy defeated a combined Qing-Dutch fleet commanded by Han Banner general Ma Degong in 1664 and Ma was killed in the battle.

The Dutch looted relics and killed monks after attacking a Buddhist complex at Putuoshan on the Zhoushan islands in 1665.

Zheng Jing's navy executed thirty four Dutch sailors and drowned eight Dutch sailors after looting, ambushing and sinking the Dutch fluyt ship Cuylenburg in 1672 on northeastern Taiwan. Only twenty one Dutch sailors escaped to Japan. The ship was going from Nagasaki to Batavia on a trade mission.

Government

The Dutch claimed the entirety of the island, but because of the inaccessibility of the central mountain range the extent of their control was limited to the plains on the west coast, plus isolated pockets on the east coast. This territory was acquired from 1624 to 1642, with most of the villages being required to swear allegiance to the Dutch and then largely being left to govern themselves.

The manner of acknowledging Dutch lordship was to bring a small native plant (often betel nut or coconut) planted in earth from that particular town to the governor, signifying the granting of the land to the Dutch. The governor would then award the village leader a robe and a staff as symbols of office and a Prinsenvlag ("Prince's Flag", the flag of William the Silent) to display in their village.

Governor of Formosa

The governor of Formosa was the head of government. Appointed by the governor-general of the Dutch East Indies in Batavia (modern-day Jakarta, Indonesia), the governor of Formosa was empowered to legislate, collect taxes, wage war and declare peace on behalf of the Dutch East India Company (VOC) and therefore by extension the Dutch state.

He was assisted in his duties by the Council of Tayouan, a group made up of the various worthies in residence in Tayouan. The president of this council was the second-in-command to the governor, and would take over his duties if the governor died or was incapacitated. The governor's residence was in Fort Zeelandia on Tayouan (then an island, now the Anping District of Tainan City). There were a total of twelve governors during the Dutch colonial era.

Economy
The Tayouan factory (as VOC trading posts were called) was to become the second-most profitable factory in the whole of the Dutch East Indies (after the post at Hirado/Dejima), although it took 22 years for the colony to first return a profit. Benefitting from triangular trade between themselves, the Chinese and the Japanese, plus exploiting the natural resources of Formosa, the Dutch were able to turn the malarial sub-tropical bay into a lucrative asset. A cash economy was introduced (using the Spanish real, which was used by the VOC) and the period also saw the first serious attempts in the island's history to develop it economically.

Trade

The original intention of setting up Fort Zeelandia at Tayowan (Anping) in southern Formosa was to provide a base for trading with China and Japan, as well as interfering with Portuguese and Spanish trade in the region. Goods traded included silks from China and silver from Japan, among many other things.

After establishing their fortress, the Dutch realised the potential of the vast herds of the native Formosan sika deer (Cervus nippon taioanus) roaming the western plains of the island. The tough deer skins were highly prized by the Japanese, who used them to make samurai armour. Other parts of the deer were sold to Chinese traders for meat and medical use. The Dutch paid aborigines for the deer brought to them and tried to manage the deer stocks to keep up with demand. Unfortunately the deer the aborigines had relied on for their livelihoods began to disappear, forcing the aborigines to adopt new means of survival. However, the subspecies was kept alive in captivity and subsequent reintroduction of the subspecies into the wild has been successful. In 1638, the Dutch exported 151,400 deer hides from Taiwan to Japan. Although the number of deer hides exported to Japan dropped due to the deer population decreased, the considerable number of deer hides ranged from 50,000 to 80,000 was still exported. Tea was also a major export item. After Chinese people settled in Taiwan, they started to grow tea on less fertile hillsides where rice could not be cultivated.

Although sugar cane was a native crop of Taiwan, the indigenous people had never been able to make sugar granules from the raw sugar. Chinese immigrants brought and introduce the technique to turn the raw sugar cane into sugar granules. Sugar became the most important export item as the main purpose of producing sugar was to export it to other countries. The sugar produced in Taiwan made far higher profit than the sugar produced in Java. About 300,000 catties of sugar, which was one third of the total production, were carried to Persia in 1645. In 1658, Taiwan produced 1,730,000 catties of sugar and 800,000 catties of them were shipped to Persia and 600,000 catties to Japan. The rest was exported to Batavia. Tea was also a major export item. 
Another one of Taiwan's major export items was sulfur collected from near Keelung and Tamsui.

Taiwan, especially Taoyuan, became an important transshipment center for East Asian trade networks. The products from Japan, Fukienn, Vietnam, Thailand, and Indonesia were shipped to Taiwan, and then exported to other countries as the markets demanded. The Dutch exported amber, spices, pepper, lead, tin, hemp, cotton, opium and kapok from Southeast Asia through Batavia to China by way of Taiwan and carried silk, porcelain, gold, and herbs from China to Japan and Europe via Taiwan.

Agriculture
The Dutch also employed Chinese to farm sugarcane and rice for export; some of this rice and sugar was exported as far as the markets of Persia. Attempts to persuade aboriginal tribesmen to give up hunting and adopt a sedentary farming lifestyle were unsuccessful because "for them, farming had two major drawbacks: first, according to the traditional sexual division of labor, it was women's work; second, it was labor-intensive drudgery."

The Dutch therefore imported labour from China, and the era was the first to see mass Chinese immigration to the island, with one commentator estimating that 50–60,000 Chinese settled in Taiwan during the 38 years of Dutch rule. These settlers were encouraged with free transportation to the island, often on Dutch ships, and tools, oxen and seed to start farming. In return, the Dutch took a tenth of agricultural production as a tax.

Taxation

After the Dutch took control over Taiwan, they immediately levied a tax on all the import and export duties. Although the rates of such taxation are unknown as there are no records, the Dutch must have made a lot of profit from the export duties received by Chinese and Japanese traders. This resulted in the friction between the Dutch and the Japanese causing the Hamada Yahei incident in 1628.

Another form of taxation was the poll tax which the Dutch levied on every person who was not Dutch and above six years of age. At first, the rate of the poll tax was set at a quarter of a real whereas the Dutch, later on, increased the rate to a half real. In 1644, the total amount of the poll tax imposed was 33,7000 reals and in 1644, over 70,000 reals were imposed. Coupled with restrictive land tenancy policies and extortion by Dutch soldiers, the tax provided grounds for the major insurrections of 1640 and 1652.

The Dutch imposed a tax on hunting as well. They sold a license to dig a pit-trap for 15 reals a month and a license for snaring was sold for one real. During the hunting season between October 1638 and March 1639, the total amount of the hunt tax was 1,998.5 reals. There were no licenses for fishing while it was taxed.

By 1653, the Dutch revenue from Taiwan was estimated at 667,701 gulden 3 stuiver and 12 penning, including the revenue of 381,930 from tradings. This indicates that for Dutch, taxation became the important way of making profit in Taiwan.

Demographics

Prior to the arrival of the Dutch colonists, Taiwan was almost exclusively populated by Taiwanese aborigines; Austronesian peoples who lived in a hunter-gatherer society while also practicing swidden agriculture. It is difficult to arrive at an estimate of the numbers of these native Formosans when the Dutch arrived, as there was no island-wide authority in a position to count the population, while the aborigines themselves did not keep written records. Even at the extent of greatest Dutch control in the 1650s there were still large regions of the island outside the pale of Dutch authority, meaning that any statistics given necessarily relate only to the area of Dutch sovereignty.

Ethnicity
The population of Dutch Formosa was composed of three main groups; the aborigines, the Dutch contingent, and the Chinese. There were also a number of Spanish people resident in the north of the island between 1626 and 1642 in the area around Keelung and Tamsui. At times there were also a handful of Japanese-Korean trader-pirates known as Wakō operating out of coastal areas outside Dutch control.

Aborigines
The native Formosan peoples had been in Taiwan for thousands of years before the Dutch arrived. The first census of the island, conducted by the Dutch in 1650 as they sought control of the entire island, estimated the Aborigines as numbering between 64,000 and 68,000 and comprising the island's ethnic majority. They lived in villages with populations ranging from a couple of hundred up to around 2,000 people for the biggest towns, with different groups speaking different Formosan languages which were not mutually intelligible.

Dutch
The Dutch contingent was initially composed mostly of soldiers, with some slaves and other workers from the other Dutch colonies, particularly the area around Batavia (current day Jakarta). The number of soldiers stationed on the island waxed and waned according to the military needs of the colony, from a low of 180 troops in the early days to a high of 1,800 shortly before Koxinga's invasion. There were also a number of other personnel, from traders and merchants to missionaries and schoolteachers, plus the Dutch brought with them slaves from their other colonies, who mainly served as personal slaves for important Dutch people.

Dutch women were kept as sexual partners by the Chinese after the Dutch were expelled from Taiwan in 1662. During the Siege of Fort Zeelandia, in which Chinese Ming loyalist forces commanded by Koxinga besieged and defeated the Dutch East India Company and conquered Taiwan, the Chinese took Dutch women and children prisoner. The Dutch missionary Antonius Hambroek, two of his daughters, and his wife were among the Dutch prisoners of war with Koxinga. Koxinga sent Hambroek to Fort Zeelandia demanding that he persuade them to surrender or else Hambroek would be killed when he returned. Hambroek returned to the Fort, where two of his other daughters were. He urged the Fort not to surrender, assuring them that Koxinga's troops were growing hungry and rebellious, and returned to Koxinga's camp. He was then executed by decapitation. In addition to this, a rumor was spread among the Chinese that the Dutch were encouraging the native Taiwan aboriginals to kill Chinese, so Koxinga ordered the mass execution of Dutch male prisoners in retaliation. A few women and children were also killed. The surviving Dutch women and children were then turned into slaves. Koxinga took Hambroek's teenage daughter as a concubine; she was described by the Dutch commander Caeuw as "a very sweet and pleasing maiden". The other Dutch women were distributed to Koxinga's commanders, who used them as concubines. The daily journal of the Dutch fort recorded that "the best were preserved for the use of the commanders, and then sold to the common soldiers. Happy was she that fell to the lot of an unmarried man, being thereby freed from vexations by the Chinese women, who are very jealous of their husbands."

Some Dutch physical characteristics such as auburn and red hair among people in regions of south Taiwan are a consequence of this episode of Dutch women becoming concubines to the Chinese commanders and soldiers. The Dutch women who were taken as slave concubines and wives were never freed. In 1684 some were reported to be living in captivity. A Dutch merchant in Quemoy was contacted with an arrangement, proposed by a son of Koxinga's, to release the prisoners, but it came to nothing.

Dutch-language accounts record this incident of Chinese taking Dutch women as concubines and the date of Hambroek's daughter.

Han people

When the Dutch arrived in Taiwan there was already a network of Han traders living on the island, buying merchandise (particularly deer products) from the native Formosans. This network has been estimated at some 1,000–1,500 people, almost all male, most of whom were seasonal residents in Taiwan, returning to Fujian in the off-season.

Beginning in the 1640s the Dutch began to encourage large-scale immigration of Han people to Formosa, providing not only transportation from Fujian, but also oxen and seed for the new immigrants to get started in agriculture. Estimates of the numbers of Han people in Taiwan at the end of the Dutch era vary widely, from 10-15,000 up to 50–60,000, although the lower end of that scale seems more likely.

Others

The Dutch had Pampang and Quinamese (Vietnamese) slaves on their colony in Taiwan, and in 1643 offered rewards to aboriginal allies who would recapture the slaves for them when they ran away. 18 Quinamese and Java slaves were involved in a Dutch attack against the Tammalaccouw aboriginals, along with 110 Chinese and 225 troops under Governor Traudenius on 11 January 1642. 7 Quinamese and 3 Javanese were involved in a gold hunting expedition along with 200 Chinese and 218 troops under Senior Merchant Cornelis Caesar from November 1645 to January 1646. "Quinam" was the Dutch name for the Vietnamese Nguyen Lord ruled Cochinchina (which used in the 17th century to refer to the area around Quang Nam in central Vietnam, (Annam) until in 1860 the French shifted the term Cochinchina to refer to the Mekong Delta in the far south, and Pampang was a place in Java which was ruled by the Dutch East India Company in the East Indies. The Dutch sided with the Trịnh lords of Tonkin (Northern Vietnam) against the Nguyen Lords of Quinam (Cochinchina) during the Trịnh–Nguyễn War and were therefore hostile to Quinam.

Taiwanese natives under Dutch Formosa

Background
Before Dutch settlement in the seventeenth century, Taiwanese aborigines lived in numerous tribal systems uniquely autonomous of each other; with populations between a thousand and a hundred, a census conducted by Dutch colonizers in 1650 surmised that there were below 50,000 natives in the plains area. Despite temporary alliances, similar agricultural practices, and a few inter-marriages, the tribes exhibited distinct linguistic and internal structure differences. These differences coupled with the widespread practice of head-hunting caused Formosan groups to be suspicious and cautious of strangers.

Upon arrival, the first indigenous groups the Dutch made contact with were the Sinkang (新港), Backloan (目加溜灣), Soelangh (蕭), and Mattauw (麻豆). The native Taiwanese tribes’ antagonistic predispositions led to an initial hostile relationship with the colonizers, involving several uprisings including the Hamada Yahei incident of 1628 involving the Sinkang people, and the killing of 20 Dutch soldiers in 1629 by the Mattauw tribe. VOC eventually transitioned into a divide-and-conquer strategy, and went on to create an alliance with the Sinkang and Seolangh tribes against Mattauw, simultaneously conquering numerous tribes that did not comply with these commands.

This interventionist process included the massacre of the indigenous people inhabiting Lamay Island in 1642 by Dutch forces led by Officer Francois Caron. 
After these events, the native aborigines eventually were forced into pacification under military domination and were used for a variety of labor activities during the span of Dutch Formosa. According to documents in 1650, Dutch settlers ruled "315 tribal villages with a total population of around 68,600, estimated 40-50% of the entire indigenes of the island".

Religion
One of the key pillars of the Dutch colonial era was conversion of the natives to Christianity. From the descriptions of the early missionaries, the native religion was animist in nature, in one case presided over by priestesses called Inibs.

The Formosans also practiced various activities which the Dutch perceived as sinful or at least uncivilised, including mandatory abortion (by massage) for women under 37, frequent marital infidelity, non-observation of the Christian Sabbath and general nakedness.
The Christian Bible was translated into native aboriginal languages and evangelised among the tribes. This marks the first recorded instance of Christianity entering into Taiwanese history, and preludes to the active Christian practices experienced in Taiwan in modern times.

Education
The missionaries were also responsible for setting up schools in the villages under Dutch control, teaching not only the religion of the colonists but also other skills such as reading and writing. Prior to Dutch arrival the native inhabitants did not use writing, and the missionaries created a number of romanization schemes for the various Formosan languages. This is the first record in history of a written language in Taiwan.

Experiments were made with teaching native children the Dutch language, however these were abandoned fairly rapidly after they failed to produce good results. At least one Formosan received an education in the Netherlands; he eventually married a Dutch woman and was apparently well integrated into Dutch society.

Technology
The unique variety of trading resources (in particular, deerskins, venison and sugarcane), as well as the untouched nature of Formosa led to an extremely lucrative market for the VOC. A journal record written by the Dutch governor Pieter Nuyts holds that "Taiwan was an excellent trading port, enabling 100 per cent profits to be made on all goods". In monopolizing on these goods, Taiwanese natives were used as manual labor, whose skills were honed in the employment on sugarcane farms and deer hunting.

Similarly, Dutch colonizers upheaved the traditional agricultural practices in favor of more modern systems. The native tribes in the field-regions were taught how to use Western systems of crop management that used more sustainable and efficient ecological technologies, albeit attributed mostly to the fact that due to the increased exploitation of the land, alternative means of management were needed to veer off the extinction of deer and sugar resources.

The Dutch introduced well-digging, as well as bringing both oxen and cattle to the island.

Military
Taiwanese aborigines became an important part of maintaining a stable milieu and eliminating conflicts during the latter half of Dutch rule. According to the Daily Journals of Fort Zeelandia, Dutch colonizers frequently employed males from nearby indigenous tribes, including Hsin-kang (新港) and Mattau (麻豆) as foot-soldiers in the general militia, to heighten their numbers when quick action was needed during rebellions or uprisings. Such was the case during that of the Guo Huaiyi Rebellion in 1652, where the conspirators were eventually bested and subdued by the Dutch through the sourcing of over a hundred native Taiwanese aborigines.

However, the Taiwanese Aboriginal tribes who were previously allied with the Dutch against the Chinese during the Guo Huaiyi Rebellion in 1652 turned against the Dutch during the later Siege of Fort Zeelandia and defected to Koxinga's Chinese forces. The Aboriginals (Formosans) of Sincan defected to Koxinga after he offered them amnesty, the Sincan Aboriginals then proceeded to work for the Chinese and behead Dutch people in executions, the frontier aboriginals in the mountains and plains also surrendered and defected to the Chinese on 17 May 1661, celebrating their freedom from compulsory education under the Dutch rule by hunting down Dutch people and beheading them and trashing their Christian school textbooks.

Legacy and contributions

Today their legacy in Taiwan is visible in the Anping District of Tainan City, where the remains of their Castle Zeelandia are preserved; in Tainan City itself, where their Fort Provintia is still the main structure of what is now called Red-Topped Tower; and finally in Tamsui, where Fort Antonio (part of the Fort San Domingo museum complex) still stands as the best preserved redoubt (minor fort) of the Dutch East India Company anywhere in the world. The building was later used by the British consulate until the United Kingdom severed ties with the KMT (Chinese Nationalist Party or Kuomintang) regime and its formal relationship with Taiwan.

Similarly, much of the economic policy driven by the Dutch during the colonial period was subsequently used as a basis for the beginnings of Taiwan's modern international trade. The beginnings of Taiwan's mercantile history and contemporary economy can be attributed to the port systems that were facilitated during the Dutch Formosa period.

However, perhaps the most lasting result of Dutch rule is the immigration of Chinese to the island. At the start of the Dutch era, there were estimated to be between 1,000 and 1,500 Chinese in Taiwan, mostly traders living in aboriginal villages. During Dutch Formosa rule, Dutch colonial policies encouraged the active immigration of Han Chinese in order to solidify the ecological and agricultural trade establishments, and help maintain control over the area. Because of these reasons, by the end of the colonial period, Taiwan had many Chinese villages holding tens of thousands of people in total, and the ethnic balance of the island was already well on the way to favouring the newly arrived Chinese over the aboriginal tribes. Furthermore, Dutch settlers opened up communication between both peoples, and set about maintaining relationships with both Han Chinese and native Taiwanese, which were non-existent beforehand.

See also
 Dutch pacification campaign on Formosa
 Eighty Years' War  
 Han Taiwanese: Influence of the Dutch language
 History of Taiwan  
 Landdag

Notes

References

 —

Further reading

External links

 Formosa in 17th century
 Dutch Governor of Taiwan (Mandarin)
 Text of the Peace Treaty of 1662
 Exhibition on Dutch period of Taiwan in Tamsui

 
Dutch Formosa
European colonisation in Asia
Former countries in East Asia
Former Dutch colonies
States and territories established in 1624
1662 disestablishments in Dutch Formosa
Dutch Formosa
Former colonies in Asia
1624 establishments in Dutch Formosa
Former trading posts of the Dutch East India Company
Former settlements and colonies of the Dutch East India Company
History of the Dutch East India Company
17th century in the Dutch Empire
Netherlands–Taiwan relations